Tehom ( ṯəhôm) is a Biblical Hebrew word meaning "the deep". It is used to describe the primeval ocean and the post-creation waters of the earth. It derives from a Semitic root which denoted the sea as an unpersonified entity with mythological import.

Genesis
Tehom is mentioned in Genesis 1:2, where it is translated as "deep": 

The same word is used for the origin of Noah's flood in :

Gnosticism
Gnostics used Genesis 1:2 to propose that the original creator god, called the "Pléroma" or "Bythós" (from the Greek, meaning "Deep") pre-existed Elohim, and gave rise to such later divinities and spirits by way of emanations, progressively more distant and removed from the original form.

In Mandaean cosmology, the Sea of Suf (or Sea of Sup) is a primordial sea in the World of Darkness.

Kabbalah
Tehom is also mentioned as the first of seven "Infernal Habitations" that correspond to the ten Qliphoth (literally "peels") of Jewish Kabbalistic tradition, often in place of Sheol.

Sanchuniathon
Robert R. Stieglitz stated that Eblaitic texts demonstrate the equation of the goddess Berouth in the mythology of Sanchuniathon with Ugaritic thmt and Akkadian Tiâmat, via the name bʾrôt ("fountains").

See also
 Abzu
 Atum
 Cosmic Ocean
 Nu (mythology)
 Tohu wa-bohu

References

Bereshit (parashah)
Hebrew words and phrases in the Hebrew Bible
Jewish underworld
Religious cosmologies
Biblical cosmology
Tiamat
Book of Genesis